Main Hari is a 1940 Bollywood film directed by Gajanan Jagirdar.

External links
 

1940 films
1940s Hindi-language films
Indian drama films
1940 drama films
Indian black-and-white films
Films directed by Gajanan Jagirdar
Hindi-language drama films